The 2012-13 BCHL season was the 51st season of the British Columbia Hockey League. (BCHL) The sixteen teams from the Coastal and Mainland Conferences will play 56 game schedules, starting with the 2012 BCHL Showcase in Chilliwack, BC.

Come March, the top teams from each division will play for the Fred Page Cup, the BCHL Championship. The winner of the Fred Page Cup will compete in the first-ever Western Canadian Junior A championship, the Western Canada Cup in Nanaimo, BC. If successful against the winners of the Alberta Junior Hockey League, Saskatchewan Junior Hockey League, Manitoba Junior Hockey League and the Western Canada Cup host, the champion and runner-up would then move on to play for the Canadian Junior Hockey League championship, the Royal Bank Cup, in Summerside, Prince Edward Island.

In their run to the RBC Cup, the Surrey Eagles would lose in the semifinals to the host Summerside Western Capitals

Changes
The Chilliwack Chiefs and Prince George Spruce Kings have been moved to the Coastal Conference
The Interior Conference now consists of six teams: Merritt, Pentiction, West Kelowna, Vernon, Salmon Arm and Trail.
The ten team Coastal Conference has been divided into two divisions:
The Island Division contains Victoria, Cowichan Valley, Nanaimo, Alberni Valley and Powell River.
The Mainland Division contains Prince George, Chilliwack, Coquitlam, Langley and Surrey.
For the playoffs, the Mainland Division side of the bracket will start with a best-of-5 division semifinal and a best-of-5 division final, while the Interior Conference side will start with a best-of-seven conference semifinal. The conference finals on both sides and the Fred Page Cup Final will both remain a best-of-seven series.
The season has been reduced from 60 games to 56.
The season will start with a three-day "BCHL Showcase," where all sixteen teams will play two games; One of which would be considered a home game.
The Westside Warriors have been renamed to the West Kelowna Warriors.
A team that ices the puck or shoots the puck over the glass in their defensive end will not be allowed to change during the ensuing stoppage. If said stoppage would allow for the period's one-minute "sponsor time out," it will still occur, but the offending team will still not be allowed to change.

Final standings
Note:  GP = Games Played, W = Wins, L = Losses, T = Ties, OTL = Overtime Losses, Pts = Points

Teams are listed on the official league website.

2012-2013 BCHL Fred Page Cup Playoffs

Scoring Leaders
GP = Games Played, G = Goals, A = Assists, P = Points, PIM = Penalties in minutes

Leading Goaltenders
Note: GP = Games Played, Mins = Minutes Played, W = Wins, L = Losses, T = Ties, GA = Goals Against, SO = Shutouts, Sv% = Save Percentage, GAA = Goals against average. Regulation losses and overtime losses have been combined for total losses.

Award Winners
With the exception of the Brett Hull Trophy, each award is given to two players; One in each conference.

Brett Hull Trophy (Top Scorer): Mario Puskarich (Langley)
Best Defenceman: Devon Toews (Surrey) & Troy Stecher (Penticton)
Bruce Allison Memorial Trophy (Rookie of the Year): Luke Esposito (Surrey) & Ryan Gropp (Penticton)
Bob Fenton Trophy (Most Sportsmanlike): Ryan Lough (Alberni Valley) & Brandon Mistal (Salmon Arm)
Top Goaltender: Michael Santaguida (Surrey)
Wally Forslund Memorial Trophy: Chad Katunar & Nic Reynard (Penticton)
Vern Dye Memorial Trophy (regular-season MVP): Mitch Gillam (Chilliwack) & Brent Baltus (Trail)
Joe Tennant Memorial Trophy (Coach of the Year): Bill Bestwick (Victoria) & Luke Pierce (Merritt)
Ron Boileau Memorial Trophy (Best Regular Season Record): Surrey Eagles
Cliff McNabb Trophy (Coastal Conference Champions): Surrey Eagles
Ryan Hatfield Trophy (Interior Conference Champions): Penticton Vees
Fred Page Cup (League Champions): Surrey Eagles

Players Selected in 2013 NHL Entry Draft
Rd3 65: Adam Tambellini - New York Rangers (Surrey Eagles)
Rd4 89: David Pope - Detroit Red Wings (West Kelowna Warriors)
Rd5 129: Evan Campbell - Edmonton Oilers (Langley Rivermen)
Rd6 164: Dane Birks - Pittsburgh Penguins (Merritt Centennials))
Rd7 185: Wade Murphy - Nashville Predators (Penticton Vees)
Rd7 193: Jedd Soleway - Phoenix Coyotes (Penticton Vees)
Rd7 197: Nolan De Jong - Minnesota Wild (Victoria Grizzlies)

See also
2013 Royal Bank Cup
Western Canada Cup
List of BCHL seasons
British Columbia Hockey League
Canadian Junior Hockey League
2012 in ice hockey
2013 in ice hockey

References

External links
Official Website of the British Columbia Hockey League
Official Website of the Canadian Junior Hockey League

BCHL
British Columbia Hockey League seasons